Candie Kung (born 8 August 1981) is an American professional golfer who plays on the U.S.-based LPGA Tour.

Amateur career
Kung was born in Kaohsiung, Taiwan. She was a three-time American Junior Golf Association (AJGA) All-American and was named 1999 AJGA Player of the Year. She won the 2001 U.S. Women's Amateur Public Links. While at USC, Kung was a two-time NCAA All-American and won the 2000 Pac-10 Championship.

Professional career
After turning pro in 2001, Kung initially played on the second tier Futures Tour, and she won the SBC Futures Tour Championship that year. She tied for 15th at the LPGA Final Qualifying Tournament to win a place on the main tour for 2002. She had a solid rookie season, finishing 36th on the money list. In 2003, she won her first three LPGA events, and was sixth on the money list. She finished 17th on the money list in 2004, tied for 11th in 2005, and 29th in 2006. Kung won her fourth LPGA tournament at the Hana Bank-KOLON Championship in 2008.

Kung came close to winning the 2009 U.S. Women's Open. She finished the tournament at one over 285 and was tied for first till Eun-Hee Ji birdied the final hole to take home the title.

Personal information
Kung was born in Taiwan and moved to the United States in 1995. She became a naturalized U.S. citizen in approximately 2005; She does not hold dual citizenship. She currently lives in Allen, Texas.

Professional wins (5)

LPGA Tour (4)

LPGA Tour playoff record (0–1)

Futures Tour (1)
2001 (1) SBC FUTURES Tour Championship

Results in LPGA majors
Results not in chronological order before 2018.

^ The Women's British Open replaced the du Maurier Classic as an LPGA major in 2001
^^ The Evian Championship was added as a major in 2013

CUT = missed the halfway cut
WD = withdrew
"T" = tied

Summary

Most consecutive cuts made – 23 (2003 British Open – 2009 U.S. Open)
Longest streak of top-10s – 2 (2003 British Open – 2004 Kraft Nabisco)

Team appearances
Amateur

 Espirito Santo Trophy (representing Chinese Taipei): 2000

Professional
Lexus Cup (representing Asia team): 2005, 2006 (winners), 2007 (winners), 2008
International Crown (representing Taiwan/Chinese Taipei): 2014, 2016, 2018

References

External links

Taiwanese female golfers
American female golfers
LPGA Tour golfers
Olympic golfers of Taiwan
Golfers at the 2016 Summer Olympics
Golfers from Texas
American sportspeople of Taiwanese descent
American sportswomen of Chinese descent
Taiwanese emigrants to the United States
Sportspeople from Kaohsiung
People from Allen, Texas
Sportspeople from the Dallas–Fort Worth metroplex
1981 births
Living people
21st-century American women